Oppenheim's sign is dorsiflexion of the great toe elicited by irritation downward of the medial side of the tibia. It is one of a number of Babinski-like responses.The sign's presence indicates a damage to the pyramidal tract.

It is named for Hermann Oppenheim.

Refer

Symptoms and signs: Nervous system